Kristen Raath (born 3 May 1996), is a South African actress and musician. She is best known for the role "Amorey Welman" in the soap opera 7de Laan.

Personal life
Kristen was born on 3 May 1996 in Nelspruit, South Africa. Apart from music and drama, she excelled in sports and won provincial colors for artistic and rhythmic gymnastics and ringball.

At the end of 2019, she had an undiagnosed illness and was quarantined in hospital with a variety of symptoms. After her recovery, she completed her BSc degree in computer science.

She is being dated with fellow actor Markus Haywood for many years, particularly during the shooting of the soapie 7de Laan. In the soapie, Markus plays the role of "Willem Spies".

Career
During high school life, she started music and dancing where she appeared in many shows and musical productions. During this period, she also directed the cheerleaders of her school for an annual inter-high. She became the choreographer for the cheerleader for five consecutive years and finally won the trophy. In her final year at high school, she made her first female lead in the Afrikaans musical titled Reik na Die Sterre, along with many popular South African musicians such as; Neels Clasen, Richard van der Westhuizen, Willem Botha, and Sarah Theron.

Later she became a member of the South African Talent Championships (SATCH) team. Through the platform, she got the opportunity to participate in the Actors, Models, and Talent for Christ (AMTC) SHINE in 2013, held in Orlando, Florida. In that competition, she won the awards as the overall finalist in acting and best commercial/lifestyle models. Along with these achievements, she received a scholarship to study at the New York Conservatory for Dramatic Arts.

In the music field, she made several popular hits such as; A Hoarder's Closet, Ek Reik Na Die Sterre, Into You, Showreel, and Fix You. In 2015, she joined the cast of popular South African SABC 2 soap opera 7de Laan and playd the role "Amorey Welman" for four consecutive years until 2019. Then she retired from the soapie to focus more in music. In 2015, she performed in the "Follicle the Musical", which forms part of the Broadway Performance Showcase Experience (BPSE) took place at Monte de Dios Conference Centre in Pretoria from March 30 to April 11. In 2019, she released her first single, My Elke Dag. However, she returned to the soapie in 2021.

Filmography

References

External links
 IMDb

Living people
South African film actresses
1996 births